Senna septemtrionalis, the arsenic bush, is a plant species in the genus Senna.

See also
 List of vascular plants of Norfolk Island (Naturalised)

References

External links

septemtrionalis
Plants described in 1802